Cyperus tweediei is a species of sedge that is only found in the country of Argentina in South America.

The species was first formally described by the botanist Charles Baron Clarke in 1908.

See also
 List of Cyperus species

References

tweediei
Taxa named by Charles Baron Clarke
Plants described in 1908
Flora of Argentina